Archibald "Archy" McNally is a fictional character created by bestselling novelist Lawrence Sanders. He is the protagonist of thirteen novels, seven by Sanders and six by Vincent Lardo, who took over the series following Sanders' death in 1998.

Novels 
Archy McNally appears in:
 McNally's Secret (1992)
 McNally's Luck (1992)
 McNally's Risk (1993)
 McNally's Caper (1994)
 McNally's Trial (1995)
 McNally's Puzzle (1996)
 McNally's Gamble (1997)
 McNally's Dilemma (1999)
 McNally's Folly (2000)
 McNally's Chance (2001)
 McNally's Alibi (2002)
 McNally's Dare (2003)
 McNally's Bluff (2004)
 McNally's Files (2006), an anthology of the first three Archy McNally novels

Setting 
The setting of the McNally series is Palm Beach, Florida.  Recurring locales include the fictional Pelican Club, the offices of McNally and Son, as well as the estates of the McNally family and Lady Cynthia Horowitz.

Characters 
In addition to the title character, the series sees a plethora of recurring characters such as Sergeant Al Rogoff of the Palm Beach Police Department, Lady Cynthia Horowitz, Prescott McNally, Binky Watrous, Connie Garcia and the Pettibone and Olson families.

McNally and Son
Archy McNally is the sole member of a division of the family law firm entitled "Discreet Inquiries".  He serves as a private investigator for the firm's clients, and often works in tandem with Sergeant Rogoff.

Characters in American novels
Fictional private investigators